Mojca Mavrič (born 8 October 1980) is a Slovenian gymnast. She competed at the 2000 Summer Olympics.

References

External links
 

1980 births
Living people
Slovenian female artistic gymnasts
Olympic gymnasts of Slovenia
Gymnasts at the 2000 Summer Olympics
Sportspeople from Ljubljana